The 2022 Stony Brook Seawolves football team represented the Stony Brook University as a member of the Colonial Athletic Association (CAA) during the 2022 NCAA Division I FCS football season. The Seawolves, led by 17th-year head coach Chuck Priore, played their home games at Kenneth P. LaValle Stadium.

Previous season

The Seawolves finished the 2021 season 5–6, 4–4 in CAA play to finish in a 5-way tie for fourth place.

Schedule

Game summaries

No. 22 Rhode Island

at UMass

at No. 22 Richmond

No. 18 William & Mary

at New Hampshire

at No. 22 Fordham

Maine

at Albany

Morgan State

Towson

at Monmouth

References

Stony Brook
Stony Brook Seawolves football seasons
Stony Brook Seawolves football